The pressuron is a hypothetical scalar particle which couples to both gravity and matter theorised in 2013. Although originally postulated without self-interaction potential, the pressuron is also a dark energy candidate when it has such a potential. The pressuron takes its name from the fact that it decouples from matter in pressure-less regimes, allowing the scalar–tensor theory of gravity involving it to pass solar system tests, as well as tests on the equivalence principle, even though it is fundamentally coupled to matter. Such a decoupling mechanism could explain why gravitation seems to be well described by general relativity at present epoch, while it could actually be more complex than that. Because of the way it couples to matter, the pressuron is a special case of the hypothetical string dilaton. Therefore, it is one of the possible solutions to the present non-observation of various signals coming from massless or light scalar fields that are generically predicted in string theory.

Mathematical formulation 

The action of the scalar–tensor theory that involves the pressuron  can be written as

The gravitational field equations therefore write

and

.

where  is the stress–energy tensor of the matter field,

Decoupling mechanism 

Thus, there is an exact cancellation of the pressuron material source term , and hence the pressuron effectively decouples from pressure-free matter fields.

In other words, the specific coupling between the scalar field and the material fields in the Lagrangian leads to a decoupling between the scalar field and the matter fields in the limit that the matter field is exerting zero pressure.

Link to string theory 

The pressuron shares some characteristics with the hypothetical string dilaton, and can actually be viewed as a special case of the wider family of possible dilatons. Since perturbative string theory cannot currently give the expected coupling of the string dilaton with material fields in the effective 4-dimension action, it seems conceivable that the pressuron may be the string dilaton in the 4-dimension effective action.

Experimental search

Solar System 

Current best constraints on the gravitational redshift come from gravity probe A and are at the  level only. Therefore, the scalar–tensor theory that involves the pressuron is weakly constrained by Solar System experiments.

Cosmological variation of the fundamental coupling constants 

Because of its non-minimal couplings, the pressuron leads to a variation of the fundamental coupling constants in regimes where it effectively couples to matter. However, since the pressuron decouples in both the matter-dominated era (which is essentially driven by pressure-less material fields) and the dark-energy-dominated era (which is essentially driven by dark energy), the pressuron is also weakly constrained by current cosmological tests on the variation of the coupling constants.

Test with binary pulsars 

Although no calculations seem to have been performed regarding this issue, it has been argued that binary pulsars should give greater constraints on the existence of the pressuron because of the high pressure of bodies involved in such systems.

References 

Bosons
Gravity
Hypothetical elementary particles
Physical cosmology
Physics beyond the Standard Model
String theory
Subatomic particles with spin 0
Dark energy
Force carriers